The Dolmen de Soto is a Neolithic subterranean structure in Trigueros, Andalucía, Spain. It is estimated it was built between 4,500 and 5,000 years ago and is one of about 200 neolithic ritual-burial sites in the province of Huelva.

History 

The site was discovered by Armando de Soto Morillas, as he wanted to build a new house in 1922 on his estate, La lobita. The same year excavation works were initiated on the burial site and by 1924 the German archaeologist Hugo Obermaier was asked to perform some research by the Duke of Alba, Jacobo Fitz-James Stuart. Obermaier discovered eight buried bodies in a fetal position accompanied with artifacts following which Obermaier published a book describing the results of the excavation and the characteristics of the funerary site. In 1931 it was declared a National Monument of Spain, but it stayed a private property until 1987, when it was included within the jurisdiction of the Spanish Ministry of Culture.

Structure 

In the eastern end of the passage there is a chamber. During the equinox, the first sun lights the interior of the passage and the chamber for some minutes, and it is assumed this was to denote an eventual re-birth of the buried. Several of the standing-stones have engravings, and it is viewed as one of the largest dolmens in Spain. The passage has 31 standing-stones in the northern part of the passage and 33 in the southern part. The standing stones are of quartzite, sandstone, and limestone and carry 20 capstones that make the roof of the passage.

Artifacts and engravings 

Each of the discovered eight buried bodies were in fetal position and had their respective artifacts beside them. Daggers, cups, and marine fossils were discovered. The artifacts found were not as abundant as those found in other sites; therefore, it is assumed that the Dolmen de Soto was not used for a long time. Engravings were found on 43 standing stones and describe humans, cups, knives, and geometric forms such as simple lines or circles.

See also
Antequera Dolmens Site
Dolmen of Menga
Dolmen de Viera

References 

Archaeological sites in Andalusia
Prehistoric sites in Spain
Dolmens in Spain